Mina Atta is an Egyptian singer and radio announcer. He participated in the tenth season of Star Academy Arab World, finishing in 4th place.

Biography 
Atta began singing at the age of 9, when he was discovered by his music teacher and promoted in school talent shows, which encouraged him to develop his talent. Atta is a guitar and piano player as well as a singer, and also a composer, having written the song "Great Stay You" for his friend and Star Academy colleague Elie Elia.

Work

Star Academy 
Atta participated in the tenth season of Star Academy, leaving the competition just before the finals in 4th place.

Singles 
 7ala Mo2akata
 Tamally Bt3'eer
 Ana Mesh Hasibak
 Ana El Sa7eb
 
 
 mo3gaben
 ma 3odty t4ely homom
 3an2oud El 3enb

Videos 
 Masr El-Bagad
 Fe Mser Bas
 Ana El Sa7eb

Awards and honors 
 Atta was honored by Dr. Susan Keliny, Dean of the Faculty of Arts at Ain Shams University
 Atta was awarded "Best Up and Coming Singer" at the Middle East Music Awards in 2015

References 

1990 births
Living people
21st-century Egyptian male singers
Egyptian people of Coptic descent
Egyptian radio presenters